Jānis Prātnieks (born 27 July 1887, date of death unknown) was a Latvian cyclist. He competed for the Russian Empire in two events at the 1912 Summer Olympics.

References

External links
 

1887 births
Year of death missing
People from Courland Governorate
Latvian male cyclists
Olympic cyclists from the Russian Empire
Cyclists at the 1912 Summer Olympics